Musanga may refer to:
 Musanga (plant), a genus of plants in the family Urticaceae
 Musanga, Burundi, a village in Burundi